In game theory, a strictly determined game is a two-player zero-sum game that has at least one Nash equilibrium with both players using pure strategies.  The value of a strictly determined game is equal to the value of the equilibrium outcome. Most finite combinatorial games, like tic-tac-toe, chess, draughts, and go, are strictly determined games.

Notes
The study and classification of strictly determined games is distinct from the study of Determinacy, which is a subfield of set theory.

See also
 Solved game

References 

Game theory game classes